The Cook County, Illinois, general election was held on November 4, 2008.

Primaries were held February 5, 2008.

Elections were held for Clerk of the Circuit Court, Recorder of Deeds, State's Attorney, Board of Review districts 2 and 3, three seats on the Water Reclamation District Board, and judgeships on the Circuit Court of Cook County.

Election information
2012 was a presidential election year in the United States. The primaries and general elections for Cook County races coincided with those for federal races (President and House) and those for state elections.

Voter turnout
Voter turnout in Cook County during the primaries was 47.95%, with 1,274,569 ballots cast. Among these, 1,091,008 Democratic, 200,750 Republican, 112 Green, 4 Moderate, and 2,125 nonpartisan primary ballots were cast. The city of Chicago saw 52.70% turnout and suburban Cook County saw 43.3% turnout.

The general election saw 73.71% turnout, with 2,162,240 ballots cast. Chicago saw 73.87% turnout and suburban Cook County saw 73.54% turnout.

Clerk of the Circuit Court 

In the 2008 Clerk of the Circuit Court of Cook County election,  incumbent second-term Clerk Dorothy A. Brown, a Democrat, was reelected.

Primaries

Democratic

Republican
No candidates, ballot-certified or formal write-in, ran in the Republican primary. The Republican Party ultimately nominated Diane Shapiro.

Green
No candidates, ballot-certified or formal write-in, ran in the Green primary. The Green Party ultimately nominated Paloma Andrade.

General election

Recorder of Deeds 

In the 2008 Cook County Recorder of Deeds election,  incumbent Recorder of Deeds Eugene Moore, a Democrat, was reelected. Moore had first been appointed in 1999 (after Jesse White resigned to become Illinois Secretary of State), and had been elected to two full-terms.

Primaries

Democratic

Republican
No candidates, ballot-certified or formal write-in, ran in the Republican primary. The Republican Party ultimately nominated Gregory Goldstein.

Green
No candidates, ballot-certified or formal write-in, ran in the Green primary. The Green Party ultimately nominated Terrence A. Gilhooly

General election

State's Attorney 

In the 2008 Cook County State's Attorney election,  incumbent third-term State's Attorney Richard A. Devine, a Democrat, did not seek reelection. Democrat Anita Alvarez was elected to succeed him.

Alvarez became the first Hispanic woman elected to this position, after also having been the first Latina to win the Democratic nomination for the office.

Primaries

Democratic

Republican

Green
No candidates, ballot-certified or formal write-in, ran in the Green primary. The Green Party ultimately nominated Thomas O'Brien.

General election

Cook County Board of Review

In the 2008 Cook County Board of Review election, two seats, both Democratic-held, were up for election. Both incumbents won reelection.

The Cook County Board of Review has its three seats rotate the length of terms. In a staggered fashion (in which no two seats have coinciding two-year terms), the seats rotate between two consecutive four-year terms and a two-year term.

2nd district

Incumbent third-term member Joseph Berrios, a Democrat last reelected in 2006, was reelected. Berrios had served since the Board of Review was constituted in 1998, and had served on its predecessor organization, the Cook County Board of Appeals, for another ten years. This election was to a four-year term.

Primaries

Democratic

Republican
No candidates, ballot-certified or formal write-in, ran in the Republican primary. The Republican Party ultimately nominated Lauren Elizabeth McCracken-Quirk.

Green
No candidates, ballot-certified or formal write-in, ran in the Green primary. The Green Party ultimately nominated Howard Kaplan.

General election

3rd district

Incumbent first-term member Larry Rogers, Jr., a Democrat elected in 2004, was reelected. This election was to a four-year term.

Primaries

Democratic

Republican
No candidates, ballot-certified or formal write-in, ran in the Republican primary. The Republican Party ultimately nominated Lionel Garcia.

Green
No candidates, ballot-certified or formal write-in, ran in the Green primary. The Green Party ultimately nominated Antonne "Tony" Cox.

General election

Water Reclamation District Board 

In the 2008 Metropolitan Water Reclamation District of Greater Chicago election, three of the nine seats on the Metropolitan Water Reclamation District of Greater Chicago board were up for election in an at-large election.

Judicial elections 
Partisan elections were held for judgeships on the Circuit Court of Cook County due to vacancies. Other judgeships had retention elections.

Partistan elections were also held for subcircuit courts judgeships due to vacancies. Other judgeships had retention elections.

Other elections 
Coinciding with the primaries, elections were held to elect both the Democratic and Republican committeemen for the wards of Chicago.

See also 

 2008 Illinois elections

References 

Cook County
2008
Cook County 2008
Cook County, Illinois